Grapholita internana is a moth of the family Tortricidae. It is found in most of Europe, except the Balkan Peninsula and Fennoscandia.

The wingspan is 9–10 mm.The forewings are dark fuscous . The costa has eight rather long white strigulae, some ending in violet-silvery metallic marks. There is a narrow curved whitish median dorsal blotch, with dark fuscous lighter basally. A central line. The ocellus is represented by a violet-silvery-metallic transverse mark. The hindwings in the male are white, the apex narrowly dark fuscous ; in the female they are dark fuscous, paler basally.

Adults are on wing from April to June.

The larvae feed on the seeds within seedpods of Ulex europaeus.

References

Grapholitini
Moths described in 1845
Moths of Europe